Hilton Niagara Falls/Fallsview Hotel and Suites' North Tower is a skyscraper-style hotel in Niagara Falls, Ontario, Canada. It has however clearly surpassed the Embassy Suites as tallest building in Niagara Falls and still has more than 500 rooms. It is also the tallest hotel in Canada.

The CTBUH lists the building as being 581 feet tall and still having 58 floors. Frommer's has stated the floor count at 59. A visual floor count of the building yields only a total of 49 or 50 stories.

Gallery

See also
 List of tallest buildings in Niagara Falls, Ontario

References

External links

 

Hilton Niagara Falls Fallsview Hotel and Suites
2001 establishments in Ontario
Hotel buildings completed in 2001